Fallen Grace is a book by Mary Hooper set in Victorian London in 1861. It is a story about two sisters, Grace and Lily Parkes. Who, as a result of the death of their mother and the absence of their father, are orphans. 

Grace takes on the role of mother to her older sister with a cognitive disability. They live in impoverished conditions until they are taken in by a wealthy family with ulterior motives.

This book has received positive reviews from Booklist, Kirkus Reviews, and The New York Times.

References

External links 

Review: Fallen Grace by Mary Hooper

British young adult novels
Victorian era
Novels set in London
Fiction set in 1861